Wilbur Edward Volz (January 1, 1924 – December 27, 2015) was an American football halfback who played one season with the Buffalo Bills. He played college football at the University of Missouri, having previously attended Edwardsville High School in Edwardsville, Illinois. Volz died in Scottsdale, Arizona in 2015.

References

1924 births
2015 deaths
People from Edwardsville, Illinois
Players of American football from Illinois
American football halfbacks
American football defensive backs
Missouri Tigers football players
Buffalo Bills (AAFC) players